Hendu Marz (also Romanized as Hendū Marz) is a village in Mian Band Rural District, in the Central District of Nur County, Mazandaran Province, Iran. At the 2006 census, its population was 372, in 102 families.

References 

Populated places in Nur County